The Fourth International (FI), founded in 1938, is a Trotskyist international. In 1963, following a ten-year schism, the majorities of the two public factions of the Fourth International, the International Secretariat and the International Committee, reunited, electing a United Secretariat of the Fourth International. In 2003, the United Secretariat was replaced by an Executive Bureau and an International Committee, although some other Trotskyists still refer to the organisation as the USFI or USec.

Background

The ISFI was the leadership body of the Fourth International, established in 1938. In 1953 many prominent members of the International, and supported by the majority of the Austrian, British, Chinese, French, New Zealand and Swiss sections together with the U.S. Socialist Workers Party organized against the views of Michel Pablo, a central leader of the ISFI who successfully argued for the FI to adapt to the growth of the social democratic and communist parties. This led to disagreements between supporters of the ISFI and those parties on how to build revolutionary parties. These tensions developed into a split, leading to the suspension of those parties which had formed the International Committee of the Fourth International (ICFI) late in November 1953.

Over the following ten years a majority of the two sides developed similar approaches to a number of major international problems: opposing Stalinism during the 1956 crises in Poland and Hungary, and supporting the Algerian War of Independence and the 1959 Cuban Revolution. At the same time, parties in the ISFI had retreated from Pablo's orientation to the communist parties. In 1960, the sections of the ICFI and ISFI reunited in Chile, India and Japan. In 1962, the political convergence between the majorities on both sides was strong enough for the ISFI and ICFI to establish a Parity Commission to prepare a joint World Congress. That congress aimed to reunify the Fourth International.

Some groups on both sides did not support the movement towards reunification. In the run-up to the 1961 congress of the ISFI the supporters of the Argentine Juan Posadas, a leader of the Latin American Secretariat, found themselves in agreement with the supporters of Michel Pablo in stressing the primacy of the anti-colonial revolution: the majority in the ISFI placed a greater emphasis on developing activity in Europe. However, Posadas and Pablo developed different reactions to the split in Stalinism: Posadas tended towards Mao Zedong, while Pablo was closer to Nikita Khrushchev and Josip Broz Tito.

A similar development happened on the ICFI side. By 1961 the ICFI had split politically, the Internationalist Communist Party (PCI) in France and the Socialist Labour League (SLL) in Britain arguing that a workers' state had not been created in Cuba, putting them at odds with the American SWP and the other organisations in the ICFI. By 1963, the split was also organizational. Each side held a congress at which it claimed to be the majority of the ICFI. On the one hand, the Austrian, Chinese and New Zealand sections met at a congress with the SWP and voted to take part in the reunification congress. On the other hand, Pierre Lambert's PCI and Gerry Healy's SLL called a "International Conference of Trotskyists" to continue the work of the ICFI under their own leadership.

Seventh World Congress: reunification
The June 1963 Reunification Congress, the seventh, in Rome represented a large majority of the world's Trotskyists in its ranks.

Among ICFI and ISFI groups, only the PCI and the SLL refused to attend; the supporters of Posadas had left in 1962. The congress elected a new leadership team including Ernest Mandel, Pierre Frank, Livio Maitan and Joseph Hansen, who moved to Paris to co-edit World Outlook with Pierre Frank.

It also adopted a strategic resolution drafted by Mandel and Hansen, Dynamics of World Revolution Today which became a touch-stone document for the International over the following decades. It argued that "three main forces of world revolution—the colonial revolution, the political revolution in the degenerated and deformed workers' states, and the proletarian revolution in the imperialist countries—form a dialectical unity. Each force influences the others and receives in return powerful impulses or brakes on its own development." Reflecting on the Cuban Revolution, accomplished without a revolutionary party, is also concluded that "The weakness of the enemy in the backward countries has opened the possibility of coming to power with a blunted instrument." This view was reinforced the following year, through the United Secretariat's resolution On the Character of the Algerian Government drafted by Joseph Hansen.

The Reunification Congress also adopted a resolution on "The Sino-Soviet Conflict and the situation in the USSR and the other workers' states". The resolution noted the declining authority of the Kremlin both inside the Communist parties and with anti-imperialist movements such as those in Cuba and Algeria. It viewed 'de-Stalinisation' as a defensive liberalisation by the bureaucracy. The Sino-Soviet split was viewed as reflecting "the different needs of the bureaucracies headed by the two leaderships (...). The search for agreements and above all an over-all agreement with imperialism on the part of the Soviet bureaucracy contradicts the search by the Chinese leaders for more aid and for better defenses against the heavy pressure of imperialism." Pablo's tendency had drawn more optimistic conclusions about the impact of de-Stalinisation. It presented a counter-resolution, but only won minority support along with some places on the International Executive Committee: it publicly broke with the International a year later, claiming that Pablo had been ousted.

After 1963 
Lambert's Internationalist Communist Party (PCI) in France and the Socialist Labour League (SLL) in Britain did not take part in the reunification congress, but discussions continued on the topic. The PCI and SLL maintained the ICFI under their own leadership, opposing key elements in the reunification documents, including the view that the July 26 Movement had created a workers' state in Cuba. They argued instead that Cuba's revolution did not bring power to the working class; the SLL believed that Cuba had remained a capitalist country. In their view, the International's support for the Cuban and Algerian leaderships reflected a lack of commitment to the building of revolutionary Marxist parties. While not rejecting reunification in itself, the continuing ICFI argued that a deeper political discussion was needed to ensure that Pablo's errors were not deepened.

Those within the U.S. Socialist Workers Party (SWP) who broadly shared this view formed a "Revolutionary Tendency" led by Tim Wohlforth and James Robertson in 1962. They argued that the party should have a full discussion of the meaning of Pabloism and the 1953 split. Along with the remainder of the ICFI, they argued that Cuba's revolution did not prove that the Fourth International was no longer necessary in the colonial countries. However, differences inside the Revolutionary Tendency developed. In 1964, with Wohlforth laying the evidentiary basis for claims of "party disloyalty" against Robertson, the tendency was expelled from the party. In the opinion of Robertson's group, Wohlforth conspired with the SWP leadership to get Robertson's group expelled.

The ICFI unsuccessfully repeated its appeal for a deep discussion with the reunified Fourth International at the end of 1963, and on later occasions. Its 1966 conference called for a Fourth International Conference. The ICFI approached the secretariat again in 1970, requesting "a mutual discussion that might open the way to the Socialist Labour League and its French sister organisation, the Organisation Communiste Internationaliste, reunifying with the Fourth International". Similar approaches were rejected in 1973.

A further departure was registered in 1964 when the only mass organisation within the International, the Lanka Sama Samaja Party of Ceylon, was expelled after entering a coalition government in that country. The ISFI had sharply criticised the LSSP's parliamentary tactics in 1960, and the LSSP had been absent from the 1961 congress, but was represented at the 1963 congress by Edmund Samarakkody.

By 1964 the LSSP's leadership abandoned the party's longstanding opposition to the SLFP, completing a political turn it had attempted in 1960, until the Sixth World Congress condemned the LSSP for offering support to the SLFP. In 1964, the International also opposed the entrance of the LSSP into a coalition government, with Pierre Frank addressing the LSSP's June 1964 conference to explain the United Secretariat's views. The International severed relations with the LSSP; it supported a split at the LSSP conference, supported by around a quarter of its membership and led by Bala Tampoe, a trade union leader, and 14 members of the LSSP's central committee. Tampoe and other LSSP dissidents organised the Lanka Sama Samaja Party (Revolutionary), which became the Ceylonese section of the International.

Eighth World Congress: anti-imperialist focus

At the Eighth World Congress, held in the Taunus Mountains in Germany during December 1965, Samarakkody was also the delegate of a new section in Ceylon, the LSSP (R), formed by an 'orthodox' tendency in the LSSP. Sixty delegates attended the congress, which witnessed a growth from an international radicalisation of students and youth. The main resolution on The International Situation and the Tasks of Revolutionary Marxists focussed the sections on solidarity for anti-imperialist struggles, such as that in Vietnam, and intervening into the youth radicalisation and the crisis in international Communism. Other major resolutions were adopted on Africa, Western Europe and the deepening Sino-Soviet split. That congress recognised two sympathising groups in Britain. One, the Revolutionary Socialist League, better known as the Militant tendency, objected to what it regarded as the uncritical way in which the International supported anti-colonial liberation movements and regarded the International's decision to give official recognition to a second, rival, group as undemocratic. Its views had deep roots, and the RSL left the International soon after, leaving the International Group as the British section.

In 1965, the International Revolutionary Marxist Tendency led by Michel Pablo split; it rejoined in 1992.

Ninth World Congress: Vietnam solidarity
The International grew substantially in the 1960s, alongside most other left-wing groups. The April 1969 Ninth World Congress in Italy gathered 100 delegates and observers from 30 countries including new sections in Ireland, Luxembourg and Sweden and rebuilt ones in France, Mexico, Spain and Switzerland. It adopted a major resolution on the deepening youth radicalisation. Over the following years its sections continued to grow principally through campaigns in opposition to the war in Vietnam, though the student and youth radicalisation.

In 1964 the current around Argentine Trotskyist Nahuel Moreno fused his followers into the reunified Fourth International, bringing in hundreds of new members from throughout Latin America.

Unification was discussed between the International and the French group Lutte Ouvriere. In 1970, Lutte Ouvriere initiated fusion discussions with the French section, the LCR. After extensive discussions, the two organisations agreed the basis for a fused organisation, but the fusion was not completed. In 1976 discussions between the LCR and Lutte Ouvriere progressed again. The two organisations started to produce a common weekly supplement to their newspapers, common electoral work and other common campaigning.

After the Lambert's current left the ICFI in 1971, its Organising Committee for the Reconstruction of the Fourth International (OCRFI) opened discussion with the International. In May 1973, Lambert's tendency unsuccessfully requested to take part in the discussions for the 1974 congress, but the United Secretariat did not take the letter at face value and asked for clarification. In September 1973 the OCRFI responded positively and the United Secretariat agreed a positive reply. However, in the rush of preparations for the world congress the United Secretariat's letter was not sent, leading Lambert's group to repeat its request in September 1974 through an approach to the US SWP. The following month the secretariat organised a meeting with the OCRFI. However, discussions decelerated after Lambert's Internationalist Communist Organisation made an attack on Ernest Mandel, which it later acknowledged as an error. In 1976 new approaches by the OCRFI met with success, when it wrote with the aim "to strengthen the force of the Fourth International as a single international organisation". However, these discussions decelerated again in 1977 after the Internationalist Communist Organisation leaders stated that it had members inside the Revolutionary Communist League, the International's French section.

The period from 1969 to 1976 was the stormiest because of a faction struggle over the centrality of guerrilla warfare in Latin America and elsewhere. The 1969 congress had adopted a sympathetic approach to the tactics of guerrilla warfare; only one of the International's leaders opposed this approach at that time, Peng Shuzi.

Tenth World Congress: guerrilla debate
The Leninist Trotskyist Tendency successfully worked to convince the international majority that it had previously supported guerrilla struggles with a mistaken orientation. In February 1974, votes at the Tenth World Congress divided 45:55 on the question of armed struggle, with a large minority opposing the generalised use of guerrilla tactics in Latin America.

The 1974 congress registered further growth, with organizations from 41 countries. According to Pierre Frank, "About 250 delegates and fraternal delegates participated, representing 48 sections and sympathising organisations from 41 countries. Compared to the previous congress the numerical strength of the Fourth International had increased some tenfold." By the time the eleventh congress arrived, a new level of unity seemed to have developed in the International.

Eleventh World Congress: end of factionalism
The years prior to the Eleventh World Congress reflected declining factional heat in the International: no international factions have been declared since then. Michel Pablo's tendency raised the question of unity in 1976, with an ambitious proposal that it and the International could eventually unify in a new organisation comprising tendencies that were, or were evolving towards, revolutionary Marxism. The secretariat felt unable to move ahead with the proposal. Pablo's tendency finally rejoined in 1995.

Two currents with roots in Gerry Healy's ICFI also came towards the International at this time: the Workers Socialist League in Britain and the Socialist League in Australia both opened discussions in 1976. Both currents would eventually merge with the sections of the International in their countries; the Socialist League merging in 1977, while the majority of the Workers Socialist League became the Socialist Group, which was to attend the ninth world congress and eventually join in 1987.

Resolutions on the world situation, Latin America, women's liberation and Western Europe were adopted by overwhelming percentages. The world congress agreed that the sections should execute a turn to industry. The congress, held in November 1979, gathered 200 delegates from 48 countries. It registered further growth above all in Spain, Mexico, Colombia and in France. The congress also opened a discussion on the place of pluralism in Socialist Democracy, which was to continue until 1985. It also invited contributions from the Workers' Socialist League in Britain, developing a relationship which led to WSL's successor organisation joining the International in 1987.

The most contested debate at the congress was on the Nicaraguan revolution. Two views developed inside the United Secretariat, but both supported the FSLN and argued for the building of a section of the International inside the FSLN. This approach was disputed by the tendency of Nahuel Moreno, which split to merge briefly with the tendency led by Pierre Lambert.

Twelfth World Congress: SWP rejects Trotskyism
In May 1982 the Fourth International opened the discussion for the Twelfth World Congress. The period before the Twelfth World Congress coincided with a deep crisis in the SWP (US). The SWP's leaders started to register a number of disagreements with the International, and withdrew from the day-to-day leadership of the International. In 1982 the Political Bureau of the SWP decided against the theory of Permanent Revolution, a key element of Trotskyism. The SWP's evolution was a central discussion at the congress, by which time the SWP's leadership had withdrawn from active participation in the International, prompting the International to launch International Viewpoint in 1982 and International Marxist Review in 1983. The International also supported the establishment of the International Institute for Research and Education in 1982.

Over 200 delegates and observers attended the twelfth congress in January 1985. The main resolutions were adopted by around three quarters of the delegates. New sections were recognised in Brazil, Uruguay, Ecuador, Senegal and Iceland, as well as a number of sympathising sections, bringing the total to fifty countries. A major resolution was adopted on The Dictatorship of the proletariat and socialist democracy, which built on the discussion at the 1979 world congress.

The SWP (US) and its co-thinkers formally left the International in 1990, following the Socialist Workers Party (Australia) which had developed similar criticisms of Trotskyism to the SWP, but had reached different conclusions by the time of its departure in 1986.

Thirteenth World Congress: 'New World Order'
The Thirteenth World Congress, in February 1991, was one of the most ambitious, addressing a systematic change in the global balance of forces. Its resolutions spanned the 'New World Order', European integration, feminism and the crisis of the Latin American left. The resolutions discussed a fundamental reversal of fortune for the anti-capitalist struggle, reflected by defeats in Central America, the 1989 revolutions in the Eastern Bloc, and the weakening of the workers' movement. The congress rejected a counter-resolution on the world situation from a tendency supported by members of the International Socialist Group and the Revolutionary Communist League: the tendency was supported by six of the 100 delegates to the congress. In the opinion of the tendency, the crisis of imperialism was set to accelerate.

But it was agreed to continue discussion on a resolution, "Socialist Revolution and Ecology", which was provisionally approved subject to approval at the fourteenth congress. The congress also approved the general line of a programmatic manifesto, titled "Socialism or barbarism on the eve of the 21st century" and to continue the discussion on it at the January 1992 meeting of the International Executive Committee. It also registered substantial growth through the affiliation of the Nava Sama Samaja Party in Sri Lanka.

Fourteenth World Congress: regroupment
Generally, however, the period after 1991 was increasingly unfavourable for Marxists. The June 1995 Fourteenth World Congress in Belgium addressed the final collapse of the USSR and the resulting realignment in the Communist Parties and the international workers' movement. The congress was attended by 150 participants from 34 countries: delegates from nine further countries were unable to attend. The main political resolutions were adopted by between 70% and 80% of delegates. The resolutions stressed the historical exhaustion of social democracy and the opportunities for political regroupment. A minority tendency was formed at the congress, supported by members of the International Socialist Group and Socialist Action (US), which emphasised the building of sections of the Fourth International above regroupment.

The Congress resolutions adopted a policy of encouraging realignment and reorganisation on the left, along with support for broad class-struggle parties such as the Party for Communist Refoundation in Italy, Gauche Unies in Belgium, the African Party for Democracy and Socialism in Senegal, the Workers' Party in Brazil, parties that also sent representatives to the congress. In a mainly symbolic reunification, Michel Pablo's small tendency rejoined at the 1995 World Congress. Pablo and Mandel would both die shortly after.

Fifteenth World Congress: transformation
By February 2003, when the Fifteenth World Congress was held in Belgium, a substantial transformation had taken part in the International. In many countries, sections of the International had reorganised as tendencies of broader political parties, while the International had established friendly relationships with a number of other tendencies. The congress resolutions were debated by more than 200 participants included delegations from sections, sympathising groups and permanent observers from Argentina, Austria, Australia, Belgium, Brazil, Britain, Canada – English Canada and Quebec, Denmark, Ecuador, Euskadi, France, Germany, Greece, Hong Kong, India, Italy, Ireland, Japan, Lebanon, Luxemburg, Martinique, Morocco, Mexico, Netherlands, Norway, Philippines, Poland, Portugal, Puerto Rico, Spain, Sri Lanka, Sweden, Switzerland, Uruguay, and the US.

The congress was notable for adopting major texts on ecology and on lesbian and gay liberation. The fifteenth congress adopted new statutes which gave the powers of the United Secretariat to two new Fourth International committees: an International Committee, which meets twice a year, and an Executive Bureau (which also refers to itself as the International Bureau).  Several years later, on March 3, 2014, the World Socialist Web Site disputed the use of International Committee of the Fourth International as the byline of a  statement by the International's leadership.

Prior to the sixteenth world congress, a major split occurred in the FI's section in Brazil. The International was doubtful from the beginning about the participation in Lula's government of a leader of its Brazilian section, later saying that "from the beginning there were different positions about ... participation in the government, in the International as well as in your ranks. But once the DS had decided in favour of participation, without hiding our reservations and doubts, we respected your decision and tried to help rather than put a spoke in your wheel. So we made an effort to convince comrades in our own sections that logically speaking the question of participation in the government should be subordinated to a judgement of the government’s orientations." As time went on, the International became more openly critical of its section's role in government. Members in Brazil were then in two different organisations: a majority group, Socialist Democracy (Brazil), which is inside the PT; and a minority ENLACE current in the PSOL, which opposes participation in capitalist government. However, Socialist Democracy withdrew from active participation in the Fourth International in 2006, leaving ENLACE as its Brazilian section.

Since the 1993 congress, the International has continued to open itself up to the participation of other currents. In 2004, for example, its International Committee was observed by the International Socialist Movement from Scotland, the Democratic Socialist Perspective from Australia, and the International Socialist Organization from the US.  In the same year, it organized an International Meeting of Radical Parties at the 4th World Social Forum.

Sixteenth World Congress: ecosocialism
The International started to prepare the sixteenth congress in March 2008; the congress took place in February 2010 in West Flanders. The congress agenda was anticipated by the discussions at the 2009 meeting of the international committee.
 The dual task of the Fourth International, building its sections and making steps to help a new international network develop.
 The capitalist crisis and its impact on the world political situation.
 Climate change and the Ecosocialism. The international committee proposed a major resolution which locates the Fourth International as an ecosocialist organisation.

According to Alan Thornett, "There were over 200 delegates, observers and invited guests from around 40 countries" including representatives of Lutte Ouvrière, Marea Socialista, and the Nouveau Parti Anticapitaliste. Delegates came "from Australia to Canada, Argentina to Russia, China to Britain, and Congo to the United States." The congress has an especially strong participation from Asia, including the new Russian section Socialist League Vpered, the Labour Party Pakistan, the reunified section in Japan and a reoriented organisation in Hong Kong.

The sixteenth World Congress was the subject of a one-hour documentary by Julien Terrie.  The film include interviews with participants from the NPA (France), Latit (Mauritius), the MST (Argentina), Dosta (Bosnia and Herzegovina), the PSOL (Brasil), the Labour Party (Pakistan), Kokkino (Greece) and elsewhere.

In March 2011, the International announced its support for anti-Gaddafi forces who fought against the government of Muammar Gaddafi during the Libyan Civil War.  However, it opposed the NATO-led military intervention which supported rebels against Gaddafi loyalist forces.

Seventeenth World Congress: Internationalism against campism
Three texts were approved in February 2017 to open the discussion for the 17th world congress. The Congress itself took place in February 2018 in the same place as the two previous ones.
 The text on Capitalist globalization, imperialisms, geopolitical chaos and their implications addressed the issue of campism: " it leads to lining up in the camp of a capitalist power (Russia, China) – or on the contrary in the Western camp when Moscow and Beijing are seen as the primary threat. In this way aggressive nationalism is encouraged and the borders inherited from the era of “blocs” are sanctified, whereas they are precisely what we should efface." It was adopted by 109 votes for, 5 against, 1 abstention, 0 No votes.
 The document on Social upheavals, fightbacks and alternatives concluded that: "The key issue in the coming years will not only be organizing adequately to counter the attacks sustained, but also the political capacity to build, alongside the social mobilizations, a political movement for emancipation capable of frontally challenging capitalism." It was adopted 108 votes for, 5 against, 1 abstention.
 The resolution on role and tasks explained that "In 2010 our emphasis had largely shifted from stressing the possible relations with already existing left organisations of different types to rebuilding the left". In the prior period, it had learnt that revolutionary regroupments "survive when there is agreement on tasks in the national situation". However, few broad left parties had appeared. However, while these were not often able to post the question of power, "the failure to seize opportunities that arise when a qualitative or quantitative advance in assembling useful class-struggle forces could be made will have a long-lasting negative effect". It was adopted 106 votes for, 6 against, 3 abstentions.

A fourth resolution on The capitalist destruction of the environment and the ecosocialist alternative presented by the Ecology Commission and endorsed by the outgoing Bureau was adopted 112 votes for, 1 against, 2 abstentions. It argues that "The struggle to defend the planet and against global warming and climate change requires the broadest possible coalition involving not just the power of the indigenous movements and the labour movement but also the social movements that have strengthened and radicalized in recent years and have played an increasing role in the climate movement in particular."

Two resolutions were not adopted at the congress.
 A resolution on New era and tasks of the revolutionaries proposed a patient, long-term approach to revolutionary regroupment as an alternative to rebuilding the left. It argued that regroupment needed "political and programmatic work which can only be collective and requires time and energy but it is an indispensable and unavoidable task". This resolution was rejected by the World Congress by 1 vote for, 95 against and 16 abstentions.
 A resolution was submitted by the “Platform for a Revolutionary International”. It argued for "a joint mobilization of the working class and the oppressed, bringing a Workers’ Government to power, to destroy the bourgeois state by relying on self-organized organs arising from the mobilization of our class in alliance with all sectors of the oppressed."  It was rejected by 6 votes for, 105 against and 3 absententions.

The International today
The International today supports several activities which support the work of progressive activists and organizations around the world. Many of them trace their roots to the 1981-1983 period when the Pathfinder tendency broke with Trotskyism.

 The International Institute for Research and Education was founded in June 1981, opening the following year in Amsterdam. According to a book reviewing the first 30 years of the Institute. "It fulfilled a plan by Jacob Moneta, the editor-in-chief of the important big German trade union journal Metall, the Belgian Marxist economist Ernest Mandel, the Swiss economist Charles-André Udry and the philologist Jan Philipp Reemtsma." No.41 Living our Internationalism: The first 30 years of the IIRE | IIRE
 The International Viewpoint magazine was established in January 1982 to replace Intercontinental Press, which for a brief period had been the common English-language publication of the Fourth International having merged with the English-language Inprecor of the 1970s. 
 The first International Revolutionary Youth Camp was held in July 1983, celebrating its 25th anniversary in 2008 25th youth camp of Fourth International - [International Revolutionary Youth Camp]. On average, around 600 activists gather for a self-managed camp organised by national delegations of anti-capitalist youth organisations. The camp has been held in several Schengen Area countries, including Belgium, Denmark, France, Italy, Portugal, Spain, and Sweden.

Participants

The organisations below are cited by the Fourth International as being FI sections and journals, sympathising organisations, organisations including FI supporters or organisations with the status of Permanent Observers. for those with websites.

Sections

Organizations with permanent observer status
Organizations who share the International's perspective of struggle but do not wish to join it formally can obtain the status of "permanent observer". This status enables organizations to participate in meetings of leading bodies—which bodies will be specified in each case—with the right to speak but not to vote.

Organizations with currents or members supporting the FI

Sympathizing organizations (including ex-official sections)

Youth groups

Organisations linked to the FI
These organisations have been thought to have had fraternal relations with the FI, but are not listed on the FI's list of sections.

Previously thought to have been sections

Previously thought to have been sympathising sections

Previously thought to have been observers

Previously thought to have contained FI supporters

Internal factions

"Revolutionary Marxists" 
Supported by:

See also
 International Viewpoint
 List of Trotskyist internationals
 List of Trotskyist organizations by country

References

External links
Official website
Old website
International Viewpoint (International's online magazine)
Insurgência (Brazilian Section webpage)
Red Mole Rising – an online archive of the then British Section, International Marxist Group related material including copies of Red Mole, Red Weekly and Socialist Challenge.